This is a list of episodes for Casshern Sins, a remake of the original Casshern anime. Casshern Sins was first announced at the Tokyo International Anime Fair 2008 with Madhouse being in charge of animation. Soon after, an official trailer was posted online on its official Japanese website. The 2008 show was directed by Shiyasu Yamauchi.

Casshern Sins centers on Casshern, who is originally a subordinate of Braiking Boss instead of being a hero to humanity. He was sent to assassinate a girl named Luna due to Boss' fears that she would liberate humanity from his grip. Her death resulted in a war that has humanity on the losing end with robots being on the verge of death due to the radical change in the environment; a legend was made known to the robots that Casshern's death can save them all.

The show had previously aired on Japan's Chiba TV, TV Aichi, MBS, TV Kanagawa & TV Saitama stations. The show aired in Japan from October 1, 2008 to March 18, 2009. Casshern Sins had also aired on Singapore's Arts Central channel. The series aired in North American on December 14, 2010, on the Funimation Channel. Adult Swim broadcast the anime on their newly revived Toonami programming block beginning on May 27, 2012.

The series is licensed and distributed in Oceania by Siren Visual with the Japanese dub intact and having English subtitles in 2 DVDs, one with episodes 1-12 and the second with episodes 13-24 for its release in Australia and New Zealand. Funimation Entertainment has announced a North American release and licensing for the show at the 2009 Otakon panel.

Casshern Sins was released in Region 2 for both DVD and Blu-ray versions. DVD Boxsets were released for ¥12,600 with from February 25, 2009, March 25, 2009, April 24, 2009 and June 10, 2009. Single DVDs were released for ¥6,300 from July 24, 2009 for Volumes 1 and 2 followed by Volumes 3 and 4 on August 21, 2009. Volumes 5 and 6 were released on September 18, 2009 Volumes 7 and 8 were released on October 23, 2009.

Blu-ray versions of the show in Region 2 were released for ¥15,750 with Volume 1 released on February 25, 2009. Volume 2 was subsequently released on March 25, 2009. Volume 3 was released on April 24, 2009 and Volume 4 was released on June 10, 2009.

Episodes

References

General
 

Specific

External links
Official Casshern Sins website 

Casshern Sins